Events from the year 1772 in Ireland.

Incumbent
Monarch: George III

Events
3 June – the London-Derry Journal and General Advertiser is first published.
27 July – the Johnston Baronetcy, of Gilford in the County of Down, is created in the Baronetage of Ireland.

Births
1 May – Lowry Cole, soldier, politician and MP for Enniskillen from 1797 to 1800, Governor of Mauritius and Cape Colony (died 1842).
16 July – William Annesley, 3rd Earl Annesley, politician (died 1838).
9 October – Mary Tighe, poet (died 1810).
Robert Blake, dentist, first State Dentist of Dublin (died 1822).
Edward Southwell Ruthven, Repealer politician and member of the United Kingdom Parliament (died 1836).

Deaths
10 June – Abraham Creighton, 1st Baron Erne, peer.

References 

 
Years of the 18th century in Ireland
Ireland
1770s in Ireland